The Great or Bolshoi Petrovsky bridge is  a bridge across Little Nevka in St. Petersburg, Russia, connecting Petrovsky Island with Krestovsky Island and passing over a small nameless islet on Little Nevka. It is very near the mouth of the river, which flows into the Finnish Gulf.

A wooden draw bridge was built in 1838. In 1916 the bridge was accommodated to two-way vehicular traffic. In December 1993, ice destroyed part of the bridge structure. The construction of a new bridge was started in 2009, and this opened in 2010. In the latter year, the old wooden bridge was dismantled.

Rasputin
 On 1 January 1917, Grigori Rasputin's body was found near the bridge.

See also 
 List of bridges in Saint Petersburg

References

Sources
 Nelipa, Margarita (2010). The Murder of Grigorii Rasputin: A Conspiracy That Brought Down the Russian Empire. Bowmanville, ON: Gilbert's Books. pp. 252–253. 

Bridges completed in 2010
Bridges in Saint Petersburg